Mathé Altéry (born Marie-Thérèse Renée Micheline Altare, 12 September 1927) is a French soprano prominent in the 1950s and 1960s. Mathé Altéry is the daughter of French tenor Mario Altéry.

Career
Altéry was born in Paris.  She began her singing career in Cherbourg-Octeville, Manche, Normandy, where her father was working at the time.  After studying classical music, Altéry began as a chorister at the Théâtre du Châtelet in Paris, in the operetta Annie du Far-West (Annie of the Wild West).  In 1956, Altéry represented France in the first Eurovision Song Contest, with the song "Le temps perdu" (Lost Time). During the first contest only the winning song was announced, and so the rank of her song is unknown. As of 2022, she is the oldest living Eurovision contestant.

See also
 Category of sopranos
 Eurovision Song Contest 1956
 France in the Eurovision Song Contest

References

External links

Eurovision Song Contest entrants for France
Eurovision Song Contest entrants of 1956
French sopranos
1927 births
Living people
Singers from Paris
Chevaliers of the Légion d'honneur